The Know was an Australian talk show on Max.

Starring
The pop culture show featured Yumi Stynes, musician Jimmy Barnes and actress Lisa Hensley as the main show hosts along with former Machine Gun Fellatio keyboardist, Chit Chat Von Loopin Stab.

The show discussed and reviewed movies, music, television and the creative arts.

Former panelists
Peter Timbs

External links
 The Know @ MaxTV.com.au
 MaxTV.com.au

Max (Australian TV channel) original programming
Australian television talk shows
Australian music television series